The Helensburgh No. 1 reservoir is of the non-impounding variety. It is no longer part of the local water supply system and is used by Helensburgh Angling Club. The earthen dam is 6 metres high and records show it was constructed before 1868.

See also
 List of reservoirs and dams in the United Kingdom

References

Sources
"Argyll and Bute Council Reservoirs Act 1975 Public Register"

Reservoirs in Argyll and Bute